Steinwand may refer to:

Steinwand (Rhön), a mountain of Hesse, Germany

People with the surname
Rudolf Steinwand (1906–1982), German politician